Bicycle Heaven is the largest transportation museum in the world dedicated to bicycles. The museum was founded by Craig Morrow and comprises his personal collection gathered over decades. It is located in Pittsburgh, Pennsylvania.

The museum is an active collection. The 650m² show room contains over 3,500 bicycles with an additional 27,000 in storage. There are over 100,000 parts to keep the collection in repair.

Bicycle Heaven maintains free entry by serving as a bike shop and consulting as prop agents for film, television and theatrical productions. After filming the bicycles are returned and become part of the permanent collection.

History 
Bicycle Heaven was founded in 2011.

Exhibits

Bowden Spacelanders 
 Benjamin Bowden, a British industrial designer, designed a space-age fiberglass bicycle in 1946. Bowden named the design the Spacelander; it entered production in 1960 and sold for $89.50. Only 522 Spacelander bicycles were made in the original run. By the 1990s only a few dozen were estimated to have survived. Morrow collected 17 of the proposed 38 left in the world. The Bowden Spacelanders are some rarest bicycles in the museum. Given their scarcity and good condition, they are valued over $50,000 each.

Pee-Wee Herman's Bicycle 

One of the jewels of the museum is one of the prop bikes used as Pee-wee Herman's bicycle, the MacGuffin of the film Pee-wee's Big Adventure.

Other Movie Bicycles 

The museum displays bicycles used in the films A Beautiful Mind, Fences, Super 8, and others.

References

External links 

2011 establishments in Pennsylvania
Bicycle museums
Museums established in 2011
Museums in Pittsburgh
Tourist attractions in Pittsburgh